801 (eight hundred [and] one) is the natural number following 800 and preceding 802.

801 is the sum of a square and positive cube in more than one way, and a sum of distinct positive cubes in more than one way:

In the gematria of 2nd century bishop Irenaeus, 801 stands for both the Greek word for a dove, and for Alpha and Omega, and therefore represents God in two ways.

See also
801 (disambiguation)

References

Integers